Air Marshal Sir Christopher Harold Hartley  (31 January 1913 – 29 July 1998) was a senior Royal Air Force officer who served as Deputy Chief of the Air Staff from 1963 to 1966.

RAF career
Educated at Eton College and Balliol College, Oxford, Hartley joined the Royal Air Force in 1938. He served in World War II as a pilot and then as assistant director of Intelligence (Technical). After the war he became Chief of Staff at Headquarters No 12 (Fighter) Group. He went on to be Air Officer Commanding No. 12 Group in 1959, Assistant Chief of the Air Staff (Operational Requirements) in 1961 and Deputy Chief of the Air Staff in 1963 before being made Controllor of Aircraft in 1967 and retiring in 1970.

Family
The son of noted chemist Harold Hartley, Christopher Hartley married Anne Sitwell in 1937. Following the dissolution of his first marriage, he married Margaret Watson in 1944; they had two sons.

References

|-

1913 births
1998 deaths
People educated at Eton College
Alumni of Balliol College, Oxford
Knights Commander of the Order of the Bath
Commanders of the Order of the British Empire
Recipients of the Distinguished Flying Cross (United Kingdom)
Recipients of the Air Force Cross (United Kingdom)
Royal Air Force air marshals